Bugganipalle is a census town in Kurnool district  in the state of Andhra Pradesh, India.

Demographics
 India census, Bugganipalle had a population of 11,470. Males constitute 51% of the population and females 49%. Bugganipalle has an average literacy rate of 58%, lower than the national average of 59.5%; with male literacy of 70% and female literacy of 45%. 12% of the population is under 6 years of age.

References

Cities and towns in Kurnool district